Oosterboschite is a rare selenide mineral with the formula . It crystallises in the orthorhombic crystal system. It has a creamy yellow colour and a Moh's hardness of 5. It is often found as grains with no clear shape. The crystals are opaque and often no bigger than 0.4 mm.

Occurrence 
The mineral was approved by the IMA in 1970, after being discovered in the Musonoi Cu–Co mine, near Kolwezi, Katanga Province, Congo. It was later also discovered at the Copper Hills prospect, East Pilbara, Australia, and at Hope’s Nose, Torquay, Devon, England. It is often found in the oxidation zones of the mines, together with verbeekite, trogtalite, selenian digenite, covellite, gold, and chrisstanleyite. It was named after Robert Oosterbosch, a Belgian mining engineer that was very active in the Katanga region, where the type locality is also located.

See also 
 List of minerals
 List of minerals named after people

References 

Selenide minerals
Copper minerals
Palladium minerals
Orthorhombic minerals